The Almonte Inferno are a junior ice hockey team based in Almonte, Ontario.  They play in the National Capital Junior Hockey League.

History 
On March 30, 2017, a franchise was awarded to Blackburn, Ontario to start play in the 2017–18 season along with 3 other new franchises.

On April 16, 2018, the Blackburn Inferno would be sold and moved to Carp, Ontario and named the West Carleton Inferno. They would announce their home arena to be the W. Erskine Johnston Arena in Carp, Ontario.

On August 27, 2021, the West Carleton Inferno would announce on social media that they were relocating to  Almonte, Ontario and named the Almonte Inferno. Playing out of the Almonte & District Community Centre in Almonte, Ontario.

Season-by-season record 
Note: GP = Games Played, W = Wins, L = Losses, T = Ties, OTL = Overtime Losses, GF = Goals for, GA = Goals against

External links 

 Website
 Facebook
 Twitter
 Instagram

Eastern Ontario Junior C Hockey League teams
Ice hockey teams in Ontario
Ice hockey clubs established in 2017
2017 establishments in Ontario